Aaron Hoey is a Gaelic footballer from County Louth, Ireland. He plays with the Louth and St.Bride's GFC.  He was part of the Louth team that played in the final of the Leinster Senior Football Championship  in 2010 where he appeared as a sub, but were beaten in controversial circumstances by Meath.

Honours

 Tommy Murphy Cup: 2006
 All Ireland 'B' Football Championship: 1997
 National Football League Division 2: 2000, 2006
 National Football League Division 3: 2011
Intermediate Championship: 2020

References

External links 
 gaainfo.com

Louth inter-county Gaelic footballers
Living people
Year of birth missing (living people)